Paul Emile Rivard (January 15, 1896 – February 1, 1991) was a Canadian professional ice hockey player. He played with the Regina Capitals of the Western Canada Hockey League.

He was the last surviving former player of the Regina Capitals.

References

External links

1896 births
1991 deaths
Canadian ice hockey centres
Ice hockey people from Manitoba
People from Emerson, Manitoba
Regina Capitals players